More ABBA Gold: More ABBA Hits is a compilation album by Swedish pop group ABBA. Released in 1993, it was the follow-up to the highly successful Gold: Greatest Hits, released the previous year, and went on to sell 3 million copies.

Overview
While Gold: Greatest Hits had showcased 19 of the group's biggest and most recognisable hits, this left out a number of other sizeable international hits, such as "Summer Night City", "I Do, I Do, I Do, I Do, I Do" and "Angeleyes". These were included here as well as some of ABBA's lesser-known hits from the time when their popularity was declining, such as "Head over Heels" and "The Day Before You Came." Also included are several B-sides and album tracks, plus one previously unreleased track; "I Am the City", dating back to ABBA’s final recording sessions in 1982.

Release
Like Gold: Greatest Hits, a remaster of More ABBA Gold: More ABBA Hits was released in 1999. A 4:27 edited version of "The Visitors" was replaced by the original 5:46 version, while a 3:18 alternate mix of "Lovelight" was replaced by the 3:46 version originally released in 1979.

In 2008 the album was re-released with a different disc and back cover to coincide with the release of the film Mamma Mia!.

Track listing

Personnel
ABBA
Agnetha Fältskog - lead vocals , co-lead vocals , backing vocals
Anni-Frid Lyngstad - lead vocals , co-lead vocals , backing vocals
Björn Ulvaeus – co-lead vocals , banjo, guitar, vocals, production
Benny Andersson – synthesizer, keyboards, vocals, production

Additional personnel
Ingemar Bergman – compilation
Chris Griffin – compilation
George McManus – compilation
Jackie Stansfield – compilation
John Tobler – liner notes, compilation
Michael B. Tretow – digital remastering (for original 1993 release)
Jon Astley – digital remastering (for 1999 reissue)
Henrik Jonsson – digital remastering (for 2008 reissue)
Carl Magnus Palm – liner notes (for 1999 version)
Michael B. Tretow – engineering

Charts

Weekly charts

Certifications and sales

References

1993 greatest hits albums
ABBA compilation albums
PolyGram compilation albums
Albums recorded at Polar Studios
Albums produced by Björn Ulvaeus
Albums produced by Benny Andersson
Sequel albums